Narciso's Hard Luck (Spanish: Los apuros de Narciso) is a 1940 Mexican comedy film directed by and starring Enrique Herrera. The film's sets were designed by Mariano Rodríguez Granada.

Cast
 Daniel Arroyo 
 Carolina Barret 
 Roberto Corell
 Joaquín Coss
 Gerardo del Castillo
 Pilar Fernandez
 Carlos Font
 Antonio R. Frausto
 Gilberto González 
 Enrique Herrera  
 Alba del Mar  
 Gloria Marín 
 Lili Marín  
 Wilfrido Moreno   
 Roberto Y. Palacios 
 Matilde Palou 
 Emilio Romero    
 Conchita Saenz
 Emma Telmo  
 Alfonso Torres
 Víctor Torres

References

Bibliography 
 Paulo Antonio Paranaguá. Mexican Cinema. British Film Institute, 1995.

External links 
 

1940 films
1940 comedy films
Mexican comedy films
1940s Spanish-language films
Mexican black-and-white films
1940s Mexican films